The Miles Morland Foundation Writing Scholarship, also called the Morland Writing Scholarships or the Miles Morland Writing Scholarship is an annual financial scholarship awarded to four to six African writers to enable them write a fiction or non-fiction book in the English language.

Character and value 
The grant is between £18,000 and £27,000 (fiction or nonfiction respectively), given over twelve to eighteen months to each chosen writer. The only requirements are that the writer submit 10,000 words every month and, if they ever get a book contract out of their writing output, donate 20% back to the foundation.

The award was established in 2013 by Miles Morland, a British citizen and philanthropist, through the Miles Morland Foundation (MMF), a UK registered charity which makes grants in areas reflecting its founder's interests.

It is one of the most prestigious writing scholarships on the African continent.

It is currently judged by three writers and publishers: Muthoni Garland, Cassava Republic Press director Bibi Bakare-Yusuf, and Brittle Paper deputy editor Otosirieze Obi-Young.

Recipients
The prizewinners are as follows:

2013

Percy Zvomuya (South Africa) - non-fiction
Doreen Baingana (Uganda) - fiction
Tony Mochama (Kenya)

2014 

 Yewande Omotosho (Nigeria) - fiction
 Ahmed Khalifa (Egypt)
 Ndinda Kioko (Kenya) - fiction
 Simone Haysom (South Africa)

2015 

 Noo Saro-Wiwa (Nigeria)
 Bolaji Odofin (Nigeria)
 Fatin Abbas (Sudan)
 Karen Jennings (South Africa)
 Akwaeke Emezi (Nigeria) - fiction

2016

 Nneoma Ike-Njoku (Nigeria)
 Lidudumalingani Mqombothi (South Africa) - fiction
 Ayesha Harruna Attah (Ghana)
 Abdul Adan (Somalia) - fiction

2017

 Alemseged Tesfai (Eritrea)
 F.T.Kola (South Africa)
 Eloghosa Osunde (Nigeria)
 Bryony Rheam (Zimbabwe)
 Elnathan John (Nigeria)

2018

 Edwige Renee Dro (Côte d'Ivoire)
 Kola Tubosun (Nigeria) - non-fiction
 Sibabalwe Oscar Masinyana (South Africa)
 Siphiwe Gloria Ndlovu (Zimbabwe)

2019 

 Gloria Mwaniga Odari (Kenya)
Hawa Jande Golakai (Liberia)
Nnamdi Oguike (Nigeria)
Parselelo ole Kantai (Kenya)

References 

Scholarships
English-language literary awards
Fiction awards
African literary awards
Awards established in 2013